Jaguares can be:
Jaguares (band), a Mexican rock band
Jaguares (Super Rugby), an Argentine rugby union team
Chiapas F.C., a Mexican professional football club
Jaguares de Tapachula, the feeder team of Mexican football club Chiapas F.C.
Jaguares de Tabasco
Jaguares de Zamora

See also
Jaguar (disambiguation)
 JAGS (disambiguation)
 JAG (disambiguation)